George Hughes  (August 19, 1925 – February 5, 2009) was a guard who played five seasons in the National Football League with the Pittsburgh Steelers. Hughes attended the College of William and Mary. He died February 5, 2009, at the VA Medical Center in Hampton.

Hughes was inducted into the Virginia Sports Hall of Fame in 1983.

References

1925 births
2009 deaths
American football offensive linemen
Eastern Conference Pro Bowl players
Players of American football from Norfolk, Virginia
Pittsburgh Steelers players
William & Mary Tribe football players